Ye Olde Tavern is a Grade II listed public house at 22 Victoria Rd, Kington, Herefordshire, England, built in the late 18th/early 19th century.

It is on the Campaign for Real Ale's National Inventory of Historic Pub Interiors, and features a parlour, public bar, plus a side-room, into which beer is provided via a serving hatch.

The Herefordshire branch of the Campaign for Real Ale made it their Pub of the Year for 2009.

References

Grade II listed pubs in Herefordshire
National Inventory Pubs
Kington, Herefordshire